Jered Stirling (born 13 October 1976) is a Scottish footballer, who played in the Scottish Premier League for Motherwell. He also played for several clubs in the Scottish Football League, including Partick Thistle and Albion Rovers.

External links

1976 births
Living people
Association football fullbacks
Scottish footballers
St Roch's F.C. players
Partick Thistle F.C. players
Motherwell F.C. players
Waterford F.C. players
Forfar Athletic F.C. players
Stranraer F.C. players
Albion Rovers F.C. players
Clydebank F.C. (1965) players
Ayr United F.C. players
Raith Rovers F.C. players
Elgin City F.C. players
Montrose F.C. players
Vale of Clyde F.C. players
Scottish Football League players
Scottish Premier League players
Footballers from Stirling
League of Ireland players